Bankim Chandra Chatterjee (also Chattopadhayay) CIE (26 or 27 June 1838 – 8 April 1894) was an Indian novelist, poet, Essayist and journalist. He was the author of the 1882 Bengali language novel Anandamath, which is  one of the landmarks of modern Bengali and Indian literature.  He was the composer of Vande Mataram, written in highly sanskritized Bengali, personifying Bengal as a mother goddess and inspiring activists during the Indian Independence Movement. Chattopadhayay wrote fourteen novels and many serious, serio-comic, satirical, scientific and critical treatises in Bengali. He is known as Sahitya Samrat (Emperor of Literature) in Bengali.

Biography 
Chattopadhayay is widely regarded as a key figure in literary renaissance of Bengal as well as the broader Indian subcontinent. Some of his writings, including novels, essays, and commentaries, were a breakaway from traditional verse-oriented Indian writings,
and provided an inspiration for authors across India.

Chattopadhayay was born in the village of Kanthalpara in the town of North 24 Parganas, Naihati, in an orthodox Bengali Brahmin family, the youngest of three brothers, to Yadav Chandra Chattopadhayay and Durgadebi. His ancestors hailed from Deshmukho village in Hooghly District. His father, a government official, went on to become the Deputy Collector of Midnapur. One of his brothers, Sanjib Chandra Chattopadhyay was also a novelist and is known for his book "Palamau". Bankim Chandra and his elder brother both went to Hooghly Collegiate School (then Governmental Zilla School), where he wrote his first poem. He was educated at the Hooghly Mohsin College and later at Presidency College, Kolkata, graduating with a degree in arts in 1859. He later attended the University of Calcutta and was one of two candidates who passed the final exam to become the school's first graduates. He later obtained a degree in law in 1869. Following his father's footsteps, Bankimchandra joined the Subordinate Executive Service. In 1858, he was appointed a Deputy Magistrate (the same type of position held by his father) of Jessore. After merging of the services in 1863, he went on to become Deputy Magistrate & Deputy Collector, retiring from government service in 1891. His years at work were replete with incidents that brought him into conflict with the colonial government. He was, however, made a Companion of the Most Eminent Order of the Indian Empire (CMEOIE) in 1894. He also received the title of Rai Bahadur in 1891.

Literary career

Chattopadhyay's earliest publications were in Ishwar Chandra Gupta's weekly newspaper Sangbad Prabhakar. He began his literary career as a writer of verse before turning to fiction. His first attempt was a novel in Bengali submitted for a declared prize. He did not win and the novelette was never published. His first fiction to appear in print was the English novel Rajmohan's Wife. Durgeshnandini, his first Bengali romance and the first ever novel in Bengali, was published in 1865. His essay ‘Shakuntala, Miranda ebong Desdemona’ (1873) is considered as the first attempt of comparative analysis of different literatures in Bengali and is studied closely in school of comparative literature of Jadavpur University. 

One of the many novels of Chattopadhyay that are entitled to be termed as historical fiction is Rajsimha (1881, rewritten and enlarged 1893). Anandamath (The Abbey of Bliss, 1882) is a political novel which depicts a Sannyasi (Hindu ascetic) army fighting a British force. The book calls for the rise of Indian nationalism. The novel was also the source of the song Vande Mataram (I worship my Motherland for she truly is my mother) which, set to music by Rabindranath Tagore, was taken up by many Indian nationalists, and is now the National Song of India. The plot of the novel is loosely set on the Sannyasi Rebellion. He imagined untrained Sannyasi soldiers fighting and defeating the British East India Company; ultimately, however, he accepted that the British Empire could not be defeated. The novel first appeared in serial form in Bangadarshan, the literary magazine that Chattopadhyay founded in 1872. Vande Mataram became prominent during the Swadeshi movement, which was sparked by Lord Curzon's attempt to partition Bengal into a Hindu majority West and Muslim majority East. Drawing from the Shakti tradition of Bengali Hindus, Chattopadhyay personified India as a Mother Goddess known as Bharat Mata, which gave the song a Hindu undertone.

Bankim was particularly impressed by the historical Gaudiya Vaishnava cultural efflorescence of the 14th and 15th centuries in Bengal. Chattopadhyay's commentary on the Bhagavad Gita was published eight years after his death and contained his comments up to the 19th Verse of Chapter 4.
In a long essay on Sankhya philosophy, he argues that the central philosophical foundation of the overwhelming part of religious beliefs in India, including even Buddhism, lies in the philosophy of Sankhya. He was a critique of the philosophy in the sense of its emphasis on personal vairagya (renunciation) rather than political and social power.

Meeting with Ramakrishna
Bankim was highly educated and influenced by Oriental thoughts and ideas. Ramakrishna in contrast, did not have knowledge of English. Yet they had a nice relation between them. Once Sri Ramakrishna Paramahansa, playing on the meaning of Bankim (Bent A Little), asked him what it was that had bent him. Bankim Chandra jokingly replied that it was the kick from the Englishman's shoe for he was a well-known critic of the British government.

Legacy
Tagore penned in the memory of his mentor:
"Bankim Chandra had equal strength in both his hands, he was a true sabyasachi (ambidextrous). With one hand, he created literary works of excellence; and with the other, he guided young and aspiring authors. With one hand, he ignited the light of literary enlightenment; and with the other, he blew away the smoke and ash of ignorance and ill conceived notions”

Sri Aurobindo wrote in his memory:
"The earlier Bankim was only a poet and stylist, the later Bankim was a seer and nation-builder"

After the Vishabriksha (The Poison Tree) was published in 1873, the magazine, Punch wrote:

"You ought to read the Poison Tree 
of Bankim Chandra Chatterjee."

His novel Anushilan-Tattva inspired Pramathanath Mitra to start Anushilan Samiti.
Bankim Puraskar (Bankim Memorial Award) is the highest award given by the Government of West Bengal for contribution to Bengali fiction.

Bibliography

Fiction
Durgeshnandini (March 1865)
Kapalkundala (1866)
Mrinalini (1869)
Vishabriksha (The Poison Tree, 1873)
Indira (1873, revised 1893)
Jugalanguriya (1874)
Radharani (1876, enlarged 1893)
Chandrasekhar (1875)
Kamalakanter Daptar (From the Desk of Kamlakanta, 1875)
Rajani(1877)
Krishnakanter Uil (Krishnakanta's Will, 1878)
Rajsimha (1882)
Anandamath (1882), Orient Paperbacks, 
Devi Chaudhurani (1884)
Kamalakanta (1885)
Sitaram (March 1887)
Muchiram Gurer Jivancharita (The Life of Muchiram Gur)

Religious Commentaries
Krishna Charitra (Life of Krishna, 1886)
Dharmatattva (Principles of Religion, 1888)
Devatattva (Principles of Divinity, Published Posthumously)
Srimadvagavat Gita, a Commentary on the Bhagavad Gita (1902 – Published Posthumously)

Poetry Collections
Lalita O Manas (1858)

Essays
Lok Rahasya (Essays on Society, 1874, enlarged 1888)
Bijnan Rahasya (Essays on Science, 1875)
Bichitra Prabandha (Assorted Essays), Vol 1 (1876) and Vol 2 (1892)
Samya (Equality, 1879)

Chattopadhyay's debut novel was an English one, Rajmohan's Wife (1864) and he also started writing his religious and philosophical essays in English.

See also
 List of Indian writers
 Sadhu Bhasha

References

Further reading 
 Ujjal Kumar Majumdar: Bankim Chandra Chattopadhyay: His Contribution to Indian Life and Culture. Calcutta: The Asiatic Society, 2000. .
 Walter Ruben: Indische Romane. Eine ideologische Untersuchung. Vol. 1: Einige Romane Bankim Chattopadhyays iund Ranbindranath Tagore. Berlin: Akademie Verlag, 1964. (German)
 Bhabatosh Chatterjee, Editor: Bankimchandra Chatterjee: Essays in Perspective (Sahitya Akademi, New Delhi) 1994.

External links

 
 
 

 https://en.banglapedia.org/index.php/Chattopadhyay,_Bankimchandra

  

1838 births
1894 deaths
 
Bengali writers
Bengali-language writers
Bengali novelists
Bengali Hindus
19th-century Bengalis
Bengali-language lyricists

Presidency University, Kolkata alumni
University of Calcutta alumni
Hooghly Mohsin College alumni

Indian civil servants
Indian male writers
Indian male poets
Indian male novelists
Indian male essayists
Indian male composers
Indian lyricists
Indian historical novelists
Indian literary critics
Indian magazine editors
Indian newspaper editors
Indian male journalists

People from North 24 Parganas district
Writers from Kolkata
Writers of historical romances

19th-century Indian novelists
19th-century Indian male writers
19th-century Indian poets
19th-century Indian essayists
19th-century Indian composers
19th-century Indian journalists

Neo-Vedanta
Novelists from West Bengal
Poets from West Bengal
Journalists from West Bengal

Companions of the Order of the Indian Empire